Cabaj-Čápor is a village and municipality in the Nitra District in western central Slovakia, in the Nitra Region.

History
The village was first mentioned in 1156 in historical records

Geography
The village lies at an altitude of 165 metres and covers an area of 34.422 km². It has a population of about 3570 people.

Ethnicity
The village is approximately 98% Slovak.

Facilities
The village has a public library and football pitch.

See also
 List of municipalities and towns in Slovakia

References

Genealogical resources
The records for genealogical research are available at the state archive "Statny Archiv in Nitra, Slovakia"

 Roman Catholic church records (births/marriages/deaths): 1763-1899 (parish A)
 Lutheran church records (births/marriages/deaths): 1887-1954 (parish B)

External links
https://web.archive.org/web/20071116010355/http://www.statistics.sk/mosmis/eng/run.html
Surnames of living people in CabajCapor

Villages and municipalities in Nitra District